Marilena Widmer (born 7 August 1997) is a Swiss footballer who plays as a defender for Grasshopper Club Zürich and has appeared for the Switzerland national team.

Career
Widmer has been capped for the Switzerland national team, appearing for the team during the 2019 FIFA Women's World Cup qualifying cycle.

References

External links
 
 
 

1997 births
Living people
Swiss women's footballers
Switzerland women's international footballers
Women's association football defenders
1. FFC Frankfurt players
Frauen-Bundesliga players
Swiss Women's Super League players
BSC YB Frauen players
21st-century Swiss women